Stefansson or Stefánsson is a surname of Icelandic  or Swedish origin, meaning son of Stefán. In Icelandic names, the name is not strictly a surname, but a patronymic. The name may refer to:
Baldur R. Stefansson (1917–2002), Canadian agricultural scientist; known as the Father of Canola
Davíð Stefánsson (1895–1964), Icelandic poet
Hannes Stefánsson (born 1972), Icelandic chess grandmaster
Hermann Stefánsson (born 1968), Icelandic author
Ívar Stefánsson (1927–2009), Icelandic cross-country skier
Janne Stefansson (born 1935), Swedish Olympic cross-country skier
Jón Arnór Stefánsson (born 1982), Icelandic professional basketball player
Jón Kalman Stefánsson (born 1963), Icelandic author
Kári Stefánsson (born 1949), Icelandic physician and professor of neurology; co-founder of deCODE Genetics
Ólafur Stefánsson (born 1973), Icelandic professional handball player
Sigurd Stefánsson, the author of the historical Skálholt Map
Stefán Jóhann Stefánsson (1894–1980), Icelandic politician; prime minister of Iceland 1947–49
Stefán Karl Stefánsson (1975–2018), Icelandic film and stage actor
Vilhjalmur Stefansson (1879–1962), Canadian Arctic explorer and ethnologist

Icelandic-language surnames
Swedish-language surnames
Patronymic surnames
Surnames from given names